Whattamen is a Philippine primetime weekly sitcom that aired on ABS-CBN which was aired from September 12, 2001, to February 18, 2004, and was replaced by Yes, Yes Show!. It was written by renowned writer-director Jose Javier Reyes and directed by John-D Lazatin, the sitcom starred matinee idols Rico Yan, Marvin Agustin and Dominic Ochoa, and comedian Ai-Ai delas Alas.

History
Rico, Marvin and Dominic's on-screen chemistry was first seen in the network's Saturday youth oriented show Gimik from June 15, 1996, to February 13, 1999. At that time, they were not performing yet as a group but they were close friends off-cam despite their solo careers as young actors. After Gimik was cancelled, the trio would continue appearing in different ABS-CBN programs, mostly on primetime soap operas. In 1999 and 2000, Rico, Marvin and Dominic appeared as guest co-hosts for Megastar Sharon Cuneta's birthday celebration. Their one-off hosting stint at "Sharon" was well-received, noting there was chemistry and rapport between the three.

In late 2000, the network launched Star Magic Presents, a weekly program that showcased ABS-CBN's homegrown talents in different entertainment formats. They chose Rico, Marvin and Dominic to headline the pilot episode of the program, a mini-sitcom entitled Whattamen. They were joined by Jannette Mc Bride, Gabe Mercado and JM Rodriguez. The episode garnered high ratings for Star Magic. The group did another episode of Whattamen a month after and also received high ratings again. This led the network to officially launch Rico, Marvin and Dominic in the noontime show Magandang Tanghali Bayan as a trio in early 2001 following the exit of one of its main host, Willie Revillame.

While doing MTB, the newly formed Whattamen trio made waves everywhere. On September 12, 2001, Whattamen became a full-length primetime weekly sitcom, occupying the Wednesday night time slot. Comedian Ai-Ai delas Alas joined the show as one of the main cast.

Compared to previous ABS-CBN sitcoms, Whattamen was a game-changer of sorts. It was a short sitcom, with just 30 minutes of running time (including commercials). Midway into its first season, the show was already beating the competition week after week with relevant storylines and out of the box delivery of laughs. On the second season, Whattamens running time was extended to 45 minutes. Streetboys member and upcoming comedian Vhong Navarro was added to the cast. The improved second season was also rating well. Until fate intervened.

On March 29, 2002, Rico Yan died in his sleep while on vacation in Palawan. His death left a big void in the show. On April 1, 2002, the whole cast of Whattamen paid tribute to him via the two-hour TV special Whattaguy: Salamat Rico. After Rico's death, the show aired three more episodes which he taped before he died.

The sitcom continued without Rico. New cast members included John Prats, Joyce Jimenez, Jenny Miller, Ryan Agoncillo, Melanie Marquez and Dennis Padilla. Sitcom director John-D Lazatin was assigned to direct the ABS-CBN teleserye Bituin and was replaced by Danny Caparas.

Cast
 Marvin Agustin as Matti	
 Dominic Ochoa as Ernest 	
 Rico Yan as Richy/Castro
 Ai-Ai delas Alas as Tita Vicky	
 Dennis Padilla as Yaki	
 Joyce Jimenez		
 Vhong Navarro as Elton
 Jenny Miller
 John Prats as Oca
 Candy Pangilinan as Bebeng
 Melanie Marquez
 Ryan Agoncillo
 Bobby Yan
 Patricia Ysmael
 Izza Ignacio
Melisa Henderson

Cancellation
The show was cancelled on February 18, 2004, along with its post-program, Klasmeyts to make way for the new Wednesday gag show Yes, Yes Show!.

Reruns
The show re-aired on Jeepney TV, Studio 23, and internationally on BRO in 2012–2015. In 2016, the now reformatted BRO, called Sports and Action, re-aired the series with its other sitcoms like Palibhasa Lalake and Home Along Da Riles.

Reunion Special
Aside from the rerun of the sitcom, Jeepney TV also produced a reunion special featuring the whole cast (minus Rico).  The cast reminisced about the funny moments during the show's whole run, capped with a big revelation by Dominic when one of the lead stars from the rival show Beh Bote Nga of GMA Network gave his blessing to the Whattamen trio.

See also
 List of programs broadcast by ABS-CBN

External links
 

ABS-CBN original programming
Philippine television sitcoms
2001 Philippine television series debuts
2004 Philippine television series endings
Filipino-language television shows